Shim Wan-joon (born 1980) is a South Korean actor. He is known for his roles in Hi Bye, Mama!, Queen of Mystery and Tomorrow, With You.

Filmography

Television series

Film

Awards and nominations
 11th Daehangno Festival Best Male Actor Award in 2011

References

External links 
 
 

1980 births
Living people
21st-century South Korean male actors
South Korean male television actors
South Korean male film actors